(born July 30, 1966, in Tōhoku, Aomori) is a Japanese Horse racing jockey. He was a three-time champion jockey of Kantō, riding 2000 victories in his career.

He comes from a racing family; most notably his uncle , who was a prolific jockey who won over 4,000 races during his career. He rode his first winner in 1985, on Izumi-Sanei at Nakayama. He was Japanese champion apprentice in 1985. He won his first grade race in 1988, riding Soushin-Houju in the Nakayama Himba Stakes.

He earned his 2000th career victory at Nakayama while riding Nakayama Knight, on 17 December 2011.

On November 5, 2022, Shibata became the oldest JRA jockey to win a race after he winning a race at the Fukushima Race Course while riding Billecart, a record he would break 2 weeks later at the Fukushima Min'yu Cup with Verdad Imeru. That same year Shibata was awarded the Medal with Yellow Ribbon, becoming the first active JRA jockey to win a Medal.

Major wins 
 Tenno Sho (Autumn) - (2) - Yamanin Zephyr (1993), Offside Trap (1998)
 Takarazuka Kinen - (1) - Nakayama Festa (2010)
 Queen Elizabeth II Commemorative Cup - (1) - Rainbow Dalia (2012)
 Yasuda Kinen - (2) - Yamanin Zephyr (1993), Just A Way(2014)
 Takamatsunomiya Kinen - (2) - King Halo (2000), Oreha Matteruze (2006)
 NHK Mile Cup - (1) - Taiki Fortune (1996)
 Japan Dirt Derby - (1) - Cafe Olympus (2004)
 Japan Breeding farm's Cup Sprint - (1) - South Vigorous (2003)

References

External links 
 Career statistics - Yahoo! Japan

1966 births
Living people
Japanese jockeys
Sportspeople from Aomori Prefecture